Saru Batu Savcı Bey (died 1287) was the older brother of Osman I, the founder of the Ottoman Empire. He is known to be the most 'mysterious' of Ertuğrul's children.

Name 
It is unknown whether Ertuğrul actually had three children or four and it has confused many historians. This is because of the two names, Saru Batu and Savcı. Some historians combine the two names together while others don't.

At Savcı Bey's mausoleum, there are two graves. One is marked as Saru Batu and another named Savcı, which creates this problem. However, in Ottoman tradition, there is no reference to this at all.

According to another source, Savcı was the nickname/title of Saru Batu. This was the title of someone who was a diplomat or administrator of a tribe. Savcı Bey had this post from the time of his father, Ertuğrul's leadership, and his brother, Osman's leadership.

Death 
He died during the Battle of Domaniç which occurred in 1287 before the founding of the Ottoman Empire. The Battle of Domaniç was a major turning point in the founding of the Ottoman Empire. This is why modern Turkish historians consider it the empire's first real war.

Place of burial 
Sultan Kayqubad I gave Ertuğrul, the village of Söğüt as a winter residence for the Kayı tribe which was warm to them and their animals. He gave them the Domaniç region for when it was cool. Saru Batu Savcı Bey was buried in the village of İkizce in Domaniç, where his grandmother, Ertuğrul's mother, Hayme Ana, was also buried near him in Çarşamba. His tomb was known to people as "Jad Bakr".

Family 

Savcı Bey, born to Ertuğrul, married Avna Hatun or Avna Sultan. Because of her having "Sultan" in her name, it is thought she was of some sort of royalty, however, there are no sources indicating this. She loved everyone and treated them equally while being extremely loving towards children, that is how she became Ana Sultan. She was also called Kutlu Melek for her kind personality which means "Blessed Angel". Avna became a martyr before her husband who was also martyred earlier before the Siege of Kulaca Hisar. Savcı and Avna had two sons;
Saruhan Bayhoca (sometimes called Saruhan Baykoca, Koca Saruhan bey and Hoca Saruhan bey) who was martyred very young during the Battle of Mount Armenia in İnegöl in 1284 and,
Süleyman Bey who outlived his parents and brother.

Legacy

Annual tradition 
In August, a celebration in memory of him is held in Karaköy in Istanbul, Turkey. In a video from 2019 the description is as follows: “Saru Batu Savci Bey, the son of Ertuğrul Gazi, was commemorated at the tomb of Karaköy in our district in the 732nd year of his martyrdom.” This means he died on 1287 AD, 732 years ago.

Poems 
There are also poems in the works titled “” by Ibn Kemal/Kemalpaşazâde (aka Şemseddin Ahmed). These accounts may be unreliable but they mention that he died in the Battle of Domaniç.

In popular culture 
In the Turkish television series Diriliş: Ertuğrul, he is played by the Turkish actor, Kerem Bekişoğlu, and in the sequel to the show, Kuruluş: Osman, he is played by Kanbolat Görkem Arslan.

In Kuruluş Osman, Yağızkan Dikmen appears as Bayhoca. Savcı Bey's wife also appears but is named as "Lena Hatun", portrayed by Seray Kaya.

References

External links

13th-century people from the Ottoman Empire
Year of birth uncertain
Place of birth unknown
Oghuz Turks
1285 deaths